= Mary Drain Albro =

American hortculturalist

Mary Drain Albro (May 5, 1874 – December 1962) was an American horticulturalist and historian. She was the founder of the Pioneer Rose Association, an organization which celebrated "Pioneer roses", roses which had been brought to Oregon before its 1859 statehood, by pioneers, mostly women, either on the Oregon Trail or on the ocean voyage around Cape Horn.
